Chakraqucha (Quechua chakra field, qucha lake, "field lake", hispanicized spelling Chacracocha)  is a mountain, lying south of a small lake of the same name in the Cordillera Central in the Andes of Peru, about  high. It is located in both the Lima Region, Huarochirí Province, Quinti District, and in the Yauyos Province, Tanta District.

References

Mountains of Peru
Mountains of Lima Region
Lakes of Peru
Lakes of Lima Region